Sri Ma Vidyalaya is a high school in the Patlipada district of Thane, Maharashtra, India. It is a Central Board of Secondary Education (CBSE) school.

Founded in 2002, the school is a part of the Sri Ma Group of Institutions.  The group was founded by Sri Tara Ma.

References

Education in Thane